Jessie Li (born 5 December 1992), known professionally as Chun Xia, is a Chinese actress. She is best known for starring in Port of Call (2015), which earned her a Hong Kong Film Award for Best Actress.

Biography
Li was born in Kunming.

Endorsements 
Since 2021, Prada named Jessie as its China ambassador.

Filmography

Film

Television series

Awards and nominations

References

External links 
 

1992 births
Living people
21st-century Chinese actresses
Actresses from Yunnan
Chinese film actresses
Chinese television actresses
Best Newcomer Asian Film Award winners